An annual plant is a plant that completes its life cycle, from germination to the production of seeds, within one growing season, and then dies. The length of growing seasons and period in which they take place vary according to geographical location, and may not correspond to the four traditional seasonal divisions of the year.

Description
With respect to the traditional seasons, annual plants are generally categorized into summer annuals and winter annuals. Summer annuals germinate during spring or early summer and mature by autumn of the same year. Winter annuals germinate during the autumn and mature during the spring or summer of the following calendar year.

One seed-to-seed life cycle for an annual plant can occur in as little as a month in some species, though most last several months. Oilseed rapa can go from seed-to-seed in about five weeks under a bank of fluorescent lamps. This style of growing is often used in classrooms for education. Many desert annuals are therophytes, because their seed-to-seed life cycle is only weeks and they spend most of the year as seeds to survive dry conditions.


Cultivation
In cultivation, many food plants are, or are grown as, annuals, including virtually all domesticated grains. Some perennials and biennials are grown in gardens as annuals for convenience, particularly if they are not considered cold hardy for the local climate. Carrot, celery and parsley are true biennials that are usually grown as annual crops for their edible roots, petioles and leaves, respectively. Tomato, sweet potato and bell pepper are tender perennials usually grown as annuals. Ornamental perennials commonly grown as annuals are impatiens, mirabilis, wax begonia, snapdragon, pelargonium, coleus and petunia. Examples of true annuals include corn, wheat, rice, lettuce, peas, watermelon, beans, zinnia and marigold.

Summer

Summer annuals sprout, flower, produce seed, and die, during the warmer months of the year.

The lawn weed crabgrass is a summer annual.

Winter
Winter annuals germinate in autumn or winter, live through the winter, then bloom in winter or spring.

The plants grow and bloom during the cool season when most other plants are dormant or other annuals are in seed form waiting for warmer weather to germinate. Winter annuals die after flowering and setting seed. The seeds germinate in the autumn or winter when the soil temperature is cool.

Winter annuals typically grow low to the ground, where they are usually sheltered from the coldest nights by snow cover, and make use of warm periods in winter for growth when the snow melts. Some common winter annuals include henbit, deadnettle, chickweed, and winter cress.

Winter annuals are important ecologically, as they provide vegetative cover that prevents soil erosion during winter and early spring when no other cover exists and they provide fresh vegetation for animals and birds that feed on them. Although they are often considered to be weeds in gardens, this viewpoint is not always necessary, as most of them die when the soil temperature warms up again in early to late spring when other plants are still dormant and have not yet leafed out.

Even though they do not compete directly with cultivated plants, sometimes winter annuals are considered a pest in commercial agriculture, because they can be hosts for insect pests or fungal diseases (such as ovary smut, Microbotryum sp.) which attack crops being cultivated.  The property that they prevent the soil from drying out can also be problematic for commercial agriculture.

Molecular genetics
In 2008, it was discovered that the inactivation of only two genes in one species of annual plant leads to its conversion into a perennial plant. Researchers deactivated the SOC1 and FUL genes (which control flowering time) of Arabidopsis thaliana. This switch established phenotypes common in perennial plants, such as wood formation.

See also

 - Plant that flowers & sets seeds once, then dies.

References

External links

 
Garden plants